Union Sportive Raonnaise is a French association football team founded in 1921. They are based in Raon-l'Étape, Lorraine, France and play in the fifth-tier National 3. They play at the Stade Paul-Gasser in Raon-l'Étape, which has a capacity of 4,000.

Current squad

References

External links
 

 
Association football clubs established in 1921
1921 establishments in France
Sport in Vosges (department)
Football clubs in Grand Est